Delium (Dḗlion) was a small town in ancient Boeotia with a celebrated temple of Apollo. It was located upon the sea-coast in the territory of Tanagra in Boeotia, and at the distance of about a mile (1.6 km) from the territory of Oropus. Strabo speaks of Delium as a temple of Apollo and a small town (πολίχνιον) of the Tanagraei, distant 40 stadia from Aulis. 

There were two important battles at Delium. In the first battle, called the Battle of Delium, the Athenians suffered a signal defeat from the Boeotians in the eighth year of the Peloponnesian War, in 424 BCE. This battle went over a period of several days. Hippocrates, the Athenian commander, had seized the temple at Delium, which he converted into a fortress by some temporary works, and after leaving there a garrison, was on his march homewards, and had already reached the territory of Oropus at the distance of 10 stadia from Delium, when he met the Boeotian army advancing to cut off his retreat. In the battle which ensued, the Athenians were defeated with great loss; Hippocrates was killed; and on the seventeenth day after the battle, the Boeotians retook the temple. Socrates fought at this battle among the hoplites, and, according to one account, saved the life of Xenophon, while, according to another, his own retreat was protected by Alcibiades, who was serving in the cavalry. The Boeotians grossly outnumbered the Athenians, resulting in the Boeotian victory. The war was won in 404 BCE, with a great financial help from the Persians. The Athenians began the battle 15,000 total and the Boeotians began with 18,500. As with any battle, casualties ensued, in addition to the death of Hippocrates, the Athenians lost many. The Athenians lost 1,200 and the Boeotians lost much fewer, only 500. In the later battle, the Romans were defeated by Antiochus III the Great in 192 BCE.

Its site is located near modern Dilesi.

References

Greek colonies
Cities in ancient Boeotia
Populated places in ancient Boeotia
Former populated places in Greece